The Garfield Thomas Watertunnel was a counterculture underground newspaper based in University Park, Pennsylvania.  It was named after a military research facility at the nearby Pennsylvania State University, named for a Penn State journalism graduate killed in World War II.  The first issue was sold January 27, 1969.

History of publication
The first edition was offset printed by an Industrial Workers of the World printer in the basement of Canterbury House, an off-campus organisation not otherwise associated with the publication, and usually referred to by its unofficial name, The Shelter.  It featured a front page nude photograph of John Lennon and Yoko Ono.  After the initial issue, sale of the paper on campus was banned by Charles Lewis, the Vice President for Student Affairs at Penn State.
Future editions were sold off-campus in the town, notably by Nittany News.
As with other underground newspapers of the era, an attempt was made to suppress publication by pressing charges for obscenity ( Commonwealth vs Youngberg, Farb & Shore), April 14, 1969 .

References

Alternative weekly newspapers published in the United States
Publications established in 1969
Defunct newspapers published in Pennsylvania
1969 establishments in Pennsylvania